The Putative Holin-2 (PH-2) Family (TC# 9.B.154) is a large family with members from a wide variety of bacteria (i.e., Roseifoexus, Cupriavidus (Ralstonia), Opitutus, Bacteroides, Pirellula). As of early 2016, functional data is not available for members of the PH-2 family, but based on their size and topology, it is believed they act as holins to facilitate cell lysis. PH-2 family proteins are of 130 to 210 amino acyl residues (aas) in length and may exhibit 1 or 2 transmembrane segments (TMSs). A representative list of proteins belonging to the PH-2 family can be found in the Transporter Classification Database.

See also 
 Holin
 Lysin
 Transporter Classification Database

Further reading 
 Wang, I. N.; Smith, D. L.; Young, R. (2000-01-01). "Holins: the protein clocks of bacteriophage infections". Annual Review of Microbiology 54: 799–825.doi:10.1146/annurev.micro.54.1.799. ISSN 0066-4227.PMID 11018145.

References 

Protein families
Membrane proteins
Transmembrane proteins
Transmembrane transporters
Transport proteins
Integral membrane proteins
Holins